Harshing My Mellow is the second studio album by Bewitched, released in 1991 by No.6 Records.

Track listing

Personnel 
Adapted from the Harshing My Mellow liner notes.

Bewitched
Bob Bert – vocals, drums
DJ David Cream of Wheat P – turntables
Art Reinitz – electric guitar
Chris Ward – bass guitar

Production and additional personnel
Steve Albini – production, engineering
Art Bykaz – design
Daisy von Firth – backing vocals
Richard Kern – cover art

Release history

References

External links 
 Harshing My Mellow at Discogs (list of releases)

1991 albums
Albums produced by Steve Albini
Bewitched (American band) albums